Raynold Edward Acre (1889–1966) was a member of the Early Birds of Aviation, a small group of pilots that flew before World War I.

Biography
He was born on July 16, 1889, in Auburn, New York, to David Acre and Anna Forgette.

Acre's first flight was in a Montgomery tandem-wing glider replica at Daytona Beach, Florida, in 1909.

He married Anne M. Schatz (1894-1967) in 1910 and they had a son, Harry Raymond Acre (1911–1984).

In 1910 Acre was living in a tent outside the Hawthorne Race Track in Chicago, Illinois. Acre and Edward Andrews (aviator) worked on a 1905 glider built by John Joseph Montgomery, fitted with a 12 hp Bates engine. Victor Loughead and his half brother Allan Haines Loughead were licensed distributors of Montgomery gliders with Chicago auto dealer James E. Plew as a client. They also purchased a 30 hp Curtiss pusher which Acre was able to fly after Allen.

In 1928 Acre was working with Air Associates Inc, an exclusive east coast distributor of Lockheed aircraft. Acre flew as a passenger in the 1928 National Air Tour demonstrating the new Lockheed Vega. Acre became vice president in 1941 following a rare wartime government seizure by Franklin D. Roosevelt during a C.I.O strike. Acre stayed in the position through World War II. He remained active as a general aviation pilot, owning and flying a Beechcraft Bonanza.

He died on January 16, 1966, in Los Angeles, California.

References

External links 

Members of the Early Birds of Aviation
1966 deaths
1889 births
Aviation pioneers
Aviation history of the United States
Aviators from New York (state)
American glider pilots
People from Auburn, New York